The finance secretary of Pakistan is the federal secretary for the Ministry of Finance. The federal finance secretary is one of the most powerful bureaucrats in the country. Being the head of the Finance Division, the secretary plays an important part in shaping the country's economic and financial policies. The position holder is a BPS-22 grade officer, usually belonging to the Pakistan Administrative Service. The current finance secretary is Hamed Yaqoob Sheikh. The finance secretary is assisted by one Special Secretary of grade 22, six additional secretaries of grade 21 and one Special Assistant of grade 17-18, the most number of deputies any secretary has in the federal government, due to the enormous amount of workload.

List of Secretaries

See also
Finance Minister of Pakistan
Governor of State Bank of Pakistan
Planning Commission (Pakistan)
Cabinet Secretary of Pakistan
Interior Secretary of Pakistan
Pakistan Secretary of Economic Affairs
Commerce Secretary of Pakistan
Planning and Development Secretary of Pakistan

References

External links 
Ministry of Finance
The Bank Notes of Pakistan – 1947 to 1972 by Peter Symes
The Bank Notes of Pakistan 1972 – 2000 by Peter Symes

Finance Secretaries of Pakistan
Ministry of Finance (Pakistan)